Mulla Abdul Hakim Mujahid is an Afghan Taliban politician. Mujahid has served as Ambassadors of Afghanistan to Pakistan in the previous Islamic Emirate of Afghanistan (1996–2001). Mujahid also served as the Taliban's envoy and United Nations point of contact.

He is graduate of Jamia Uloom Islamia Banuri Town Karachi, he is fluent in Urdu and Arabic as well as English.

References

Living people
Year of birth missing (living people)
Ambassadors of Afghanistan to Pakistan
Jamia Uloom-ul-Islamia alumni
Taliban leaders
Afghan diplomats